Meador is a rural unincorporated community in northern Allen County, Kentucky, United States. The community is located near the intersection of Kentucky Route 101 and Kentucky Route 1533.

References

Unincorporated communities in Allen County, Kentucky
Unincorporated communities in Kentucky